The 1911 College Football All-America team is composed of college football players who were selected as All-Americans for the 1911 college football season. The only selector for the 1911 season who has been recognized as "official" by the National Collegiate Athletic Association (NCAA) is Walter Camp.  Many other sports writers, newspapers, coaches and others also selected All-America teams in 1911.  Others who selected All-Americans in 1911 include New York sports writer Wilton S. Farnsworth, The New York Globe, Minnesota coach Henry L. Williams, The Christian Science Monitor, former Yale stars Ted Coy and Charles Chadwick, and Baseball Magazine.

Walter Camp's "official" selections
The only individual who has been recognized as an "official" selector by the National Collegiate Athletic Association (NCAA) for the 1911 season is Walter Camp.  Accordingly, the NCAA's official listing of "Consensus All-America Selections" mirrors Camp's first-team picks. Nine of Camp's first-team All-Americans in 1911 played on teams from the Ivy League.  The only players recognized by Camp from outside the Ivy League were Jim Thorpe from the Carlisle School, Leland Devore of Army and Jack Dalton of Navy.  

The dominance of Ivy League players on Camp's All-America teams led to criticism over the years that his selections were biased against players from the leading Western universities, including Chicago, Michigan, Minnesota, Wisconsin, and Notre Dame.

All-Americans of 1911

Ends
Sanford White, Princeton (WC-1; NYG-1; TC-1; WSF-1; HW-1; CC-1; HL; BM; CSM; SPS; COY)
Douglas Bomeisler, Yale (College Football Hall of Fame) (WC-1; WSF-2; CC-1; HL; COY)
Stanfield Wells, Michigan (WC-3 [hb]; NYG-1; HW-1; HL)
Lawrence Dunlap "Bud" Smith, Harvard (WC-2; TC-1; WSF-1; HL; BM; CSM)
Dexter Very, Penn. State (College Football Hall of Fame) (WC-2; WSF-3; HL)
Edward J. Daly, Dartmouth (WSF-2; HL)
A. Harry Kallett, Syracuse (WC-3; SPS)
Busty Ashbaugh, Brown (WC-3; WSF-3)
Frederick L. Conklin, Michigan (HL)
Chauncey Oliver, Illinois (HL)
Sampson Burd, Carlisle (HL)

Tackles
Ed Hart, Princeton (WC-1; NYG-1; TC-1; WSF-1; HW-1; CC-1; HL; BM; CSM; SPS; COY)
Leland Devore, Army (WC-1; NYG-1)
Jim Scully, Yale (WC-2; WSF-2; CC-1; BM; SPS)
Jogger Elcock, Dartmouth (WSF-1)
Leonard Frank, Minnesota (TC-1; HW-1)
Robert M. Littlejohn, Army (WSF-2)
John Brown, Navy (College Football Hall of Fame), Navy (WC-3; COY)
William Edward Munk, Cornell (WC-2; WSF-3; BM [fb])
Sylvester V. Shonka, Nebraska (HL)
Charles M. Rademacher, Chicago (HL; CSM)
Greig, Swarthmore (HL)
Rudy Probst, Syracuse (HL)
Oliver M. Kratz, Brown (WSF-3)

Guards

Bob Fisher, Harvard (College Football Hall of Fame) (WC-1; TC-1; WSF-1; CC-1; BM; CSM; SPS; COY)
Joseph Duff, Princeton (WC-1; TC-1; WSF-1; CC-1; HL; CSM; COY)
Alfred L. Buser, Wisconsin (WC-3 [t]; NYG-1; HL [t])
Charles J. Robinson, Minnesota (HW-1)
Ray Wakeman, Navy (HW-1)
George Howe, Navy (NYG-1)
Horace Scruby, Chicago (WC-2; HL)
Elmer W. McDevitt, Yale (WC-2; WSF-2)
James "Red" Bebout, Penn State (WSF-2)
Pomeroy T. Francis, Yale (WC-3; BM)
Archibald V. Arnold, Army (WC-3; WSF-3; HL; CSM; SPS)
Paul Belting, Illinois (HL)
Ray L. Bennett, Dartmouth (WSF-3)

Centers
Hank Ketcham, Yale (College Football Hall of Fame) (WC-1; NYG-1; WSF-2; CC-1; HL; SPS; COY)
Arthur Bluethenthal, Princeton (WC-2; TC-1; WSF-1; HL; BM)
Franklin C. Sibert, Army (HW-1)
P. V. H. Weems, Navy (WC-3)
Willis "Fat" O'Brien, Iowa (HL)
James A. Ayling, Syracuse (WSF-3)

Quarterbacks

Art Howe, Yale (College Football Hall of Fame) (WC-1; NYG-1; WSF-1; HW-1; CC-1; HL; COY)
Earl Sprackling, Brown (College Football Hall of Fame) (WC-2; WSF-2; HL; BM)
John "Keckie" Moll, Wisconsin (HL; CSM; SPS)
Ralph Capron, Minnesota (WC-3; TC-1; HL)
 Thomas Andrew Gill, Indiana (HL)
Ray Morrison, Vanderbilt (College Football Hall of Fame) (HL; COY [hb])
Preston Doane Fogg, Syracuse (HL)
Shorty Miller, Penn State (College Football Hall of Fame) (WSF-3)

Halfbacks
Percy Wendell, Harvard (College Football Hall of Fame) (WC-1; NYG-1 [fb]; TC-1; WSF-1; HW-1; CC-1; HL; BM; CSM; SPS [fb]; COY [fb])
Jim Thorpe, Carlisle (College Football Hall of Fame) (WC-1; WSF-2; CC-1; HL; BM; CSM; SPS)
Reuben Martin Rosenwald, Minnesota (WC-2; NYG-1; HW-1; HL)
Walter C. Camp, Jr., Yale (WC-2; WSF-2; HL)
Dave Morey, Dartmouth (WC-2)
Talbot Pendleton, Princeton (WSF-3)
Robert Hogsett, Dartmouth (WSF-3)
James B. Craig, Michigan (HL)
Clark Sauer, Chicago (HL)
Elmer Oliphant, Purdue (HL)
Johnny Spiegel, Lafayette (HL)
Harry Costello, Georgetown (HL)

Fullbacks
Jack Dalton, Navy (College Football Hall of Fame) (WC-1; NYG-1 [hb]; TC-1 [hb]; WSF-1 [hb]; CC-1; HL; SPS [hb]; COY [hb])
F. LeRoy Mercer, Penn  (College Football Hall of Fame) (WC-3 [hb]; TC-1; WSF-1; HL; CSM)
Jesse Philbin, Yale (WSF-1)
Winthrop J. Snow, Dartmouth (WSF-2)
Ted Hudson, Trinity (WC-3, WSF-3)
Stancil "Possum" Powell, Carlisle (HL)
Wallace De Witt, Princeton (HL)

Key
NCAA recognized selectors for 1911
 WC = Collier's Weekly as selected by Walter Camp

Other selectors
 NYG = The New York Globe
 HL = Outing magazine published a "Football Honor List for 1911" selected by coaches from the East and West.
 TC = Tommy Clark
 WSF = W.S. Farnsworth
 HW = Dr. Henry L. Williams, longtime coach at the University of Minnesota
 CC = Charles Chadwick, "former famous Yale guard"
 BM = Baseball Magazine
 CSM = The Christian Science Monitor
 SPS = Syracuse Post-Standard
 COY = Former Yale star Ted Coy

Bold = Consensus All-American
 1 – First-team selection
 2 – Second-team selection
 3 – Third-team selection

See also
 1911 All-Southern college football team
 1911 All-Western college football team

References

All-America Team
College Football All-America Teams